Watkins may refer to:

Boats
 Watkins Yachts, an American sailboat builder, in business from 1973-1989
 Watkins 32, an American sailboat design
 Watkins 33, an American sailboat design

Places 
In the United States:
 Watkins, Colorado
 Watkins, Iowa
 Watkins, Minnesota
 Watkins, Missouri
 Watkins, Ohio
 Watkins, West Virginia
 Watkins Glen, New York

Organisations 
 Watkins Incorporated, a manufacturer of cosmetics, health remedies and baking products
 Watkins Electric Music, a manufacturer of musical instruments
 Watkins Books, a mind-body-spirit bookshop

People 
 Watkins (surname)

Other 

 Watkins v. United States (1975), a U.S. Supreme Court decision
 Watkins Biographical Dictionary, a biographical dictionary